Twyford Abbey Halt was a short-lived railway station in Park Royal, Ealing, London on the New North Main Line and was located between  and . The station was close to the location of the London Underground's Hanger Lane which opened in 1947.

References

Former Great Western Railway stations
Disused railway stations in the London Borough of Ealing
Park Royal
Railway stations in Great Britain opened in 1904
Railway stations in Great Britain closed in 1911